Igor Miličić (born June 9, 1976) is a Croatian-Polish professional basketball coach and former player who currently serves as head coach for Beşiktaş of the Turkish Super League and the Poland men's national basketball team.

Professional playing career
Miličić was one of the most talented players of the Split youth teams in the 1990-s. As the starting playmaker he was one the leaders of the Croatia national under-18 basketball team that won silver at the 1994 FIBA Europe Under-18 Championship. After suffering a serious injury and a long recovery time, he moved to the Polish Basketball League. In Poland he became one of the best players of the league.

National team career 
Miličić was named in the roster of the Croatia men's national basketball team in February 1998 for a FIBA EuroBasket 1999 qualification match against Netherlands. This was the only time he was in the roster failing to appear on court.

Coaching career
Miličoć retired in 2013 as a player of AZS Koszalin. He stayed in the same club as an assistant coach for Zoran Sretenović. After a series of bad results and head coach changes, Miličić was named the head coach. Under coach Miličić the team won nine out of last ten games of the 2013–14 PLK season, making it the playoffs. In the next season, he led the team to the 3rd position before playoffs. He later led Anwil Włocławek to two winning two Polish League championships and Stal Ostrów Wielkopolski to another one, establishing himself as one of the best coaches in Poland.

In December 2022, Miličić took over Beşiktaş of the Turkish Super League.

National team coaching career
Miličić took over the Poland men's national basketball team in 2021. He led Poland to fourth place at the EuroBasket 2022, surprisingly defeating Slovenia in the quarterfinals.

Personal life
Miličić's sons Igor Jr. (born 2002), Zoran (born 2006) and Teo (born 2008) all successfully play basketball. Igor Jr. played at the FIBA U20 European Championship and debuted for the senior Poland men's national basketball team.

References

External links
 Igor Miličić profile at eurobasket.com 
 Igor Miličić profile at realGM

Living people
1976 births
Arka Gdynia players
AZS Koszalin coaches
AZS Koszalin players
BC Enisey players
Belfius Mons-Hainaut players
Beşiktaş basketball coaches
Croatian basketball coaches
Croatian basketball players
Iraklis Thessaloniki B.C. players
KK Kvarner players
KK Split players
Polish basketball coaches
Polonia Warszawa (basketball) players
Tuborg Pilsener basketball players
Türk Telekom B.K. players